The Farrington is one of the fourteen Districts of Anguilla.  Its population at the 2011 census was 624.

Demographics

References

Populated places in Anguilla